Adesmia aegiceras is a perennial shrub found in Argentina and Chile.

References

aegiceras